In algebra, the Pareigis Hopf algebra is the Hopf algebra over a field k whose left comodules are essentially the same as complexes over k, in the sense that the corresponding monoidal categories are isomorphic.

Construction

As an algebra over k, the Pareigis algebra is generated by elements x,y, 1/y, with the relations xy + yx = x2 = 0. The coproduct takes x to x⊗1 + (1/y)⊗x and y to y⊗y, and the counit takes x to 0 and y to 1. The antipode takes x to xy and y to its inverse and has order 4.

Relation to complexes

If M = ⊕Mn is a complex with differential d of degree –1, then M can be made into a comodule over H by letting the coproduct take m to Σ yn⊗mn + yn+1x⊗dmn, where mn is the component of m in Mn. This gives an equivalence between the monoidal category of complexes over k with the monoidal category of comodules over the Pareigis Hopf algebra.

See also

Sweedler's Hopf algebra is the quotient of the Pareigis Hopf algebra obtained by putting y2 = 1.

References

Hopf algebras